The Volleyball Federation of Vietnam is the national governing body for volleyball in Vietnam. It was founded in 1961, and has been a member of FIVB since 1991. It is also a member of the Asian Volleyball Confederation. The VFV is responsible for organizing the Vietnam men's national volleyball team and Vietnam women's national volleyball team.

References 

Vietnam
Volleyball
Volleyball in Vietnam